Piţurcă is a surname of Romanian origin. Notable people with the name include:
Victor Piţurcă, former Romanian footballer and manager
Alexandru Piţurcă, Romanian footballer, son of Victor Piţurcă

Romanian-language surnames